Javier "Javi" Llabrés Expósito (born 11 September 2002) is a Spanish footballer who plays mainly as a left winger for CD Mirandés, on loan from RCD Mallorca.

Club career
Born in Inca, Mallorca, Balearic Islands, Llabrés was a RCD Mallorca youth graduate. In March 2019, while still a youth, he signed a five-year contract with the club.

Llabrés made his senior debut with the reserves on 29 November 2020, coming on as a second-half substitute in a 0–0 Tercera División home draw against CF Sant Rafel. He scored his first goal on 19 December, netting the B's second in a 6–0 home routing of Club Santa Catalina Atlético, and became a regular starter for the B-team afterwards.

Llabrés made his first-team debut for the Bermellones on 1 December 2021, starting in a 2–0 away win over Gimnástica Segoviana CF in the season's Copa del Rey. He scored his first goal for the side on 16 December, netting his team's fifth in a 6–0 thrashing of UD Llanera also in the national cup.

Llabrés made his professional – and La Liga – debut on 2 January 2022, replacing Lee Kang-in in a 0–1 home loss to FC Barcelona. Three days later, he provided two assists in a 2–1 win at SD Eibar which qualified Mallorca for the round of 16 of the Copa del Rey.

On 18 January 2023, after just 16 minutes of action during the first half of the season, Llabrés was loaned to Segunda División side CD Mirandés until June.

References

External links

2002 births
Living people
Footballers from Mallorca
Spanish footballers
Association football wingers
La Liga players
Tercera División players
Tercera Federación players
RCD Mallorca B players
RCD Mallorca players
CD Mirandés footballers
People from Inca, Mallorca